Adam Ahmad Najem (Persian: آدام نجم; born January 19, 1995) is a professional footballer who plays as a midfielder for Bhayangkara and the Afghanistan national team.

Career

Youth and college 
Raised in Clifton, New Jersey, Najem played prep soccer at Paramus Catholic High School.

Najem played four years of college soccer at the University of Akron between 2013 and 2016, making 89 appearances, scoring 33 goals and tallying 29 assists.

While at college, Najem also appeared for Premier Development League sides New York Red Bulls U23 and Michigan Bucks, where he won the 2016 PDL Championship.

Club 

Najem signed with Major League Soccer side Philadelphia Union on February 8, 2017, after acquiring his rights from New York Red Bulls in exchange for a second-round 2018 MLS SuperDraft pick. He made his professional debut on April 1, 2017, while on loan with the Union's United Soccer League affiliate Bethlehem Steel, playing 90 minutes in a 3–2 loss to Rochester Rhinos.

Najem joined USL Championship expansion club Memphis 901 on February 5, 2019.

Najem joined Polish I liga club Wigry Suwałki on January 22, 2020

On August 5, 2020, Najem returned to the United States, joining USL Championship side Tampa Bay Rowdies.

On August 9, 2021, Najem signed with Canadian Premier League side Edmonton. On February 9, 2022, the club announced that Najem and all but two other players would not be returning for the 2022 season.

On May 19, 2022, Najem signed a 25-day short-term contract with New York Red Bulls II. Najem made his first appearance for New York on May 21, 2022, during a 2-0 loss to Indy Eleven.

International 
In August 2018, Najem received his first international call-up to the Afghanistan national team.

Personal 
Adam's brother, David, is also a professional footballer.

References

External links 
 

1995 births
Living people
Paramus Catholic High School alumni
People from Clifton, New Jersey
People from Wayne, New Jersey
Afghan footballers
Afghanistan international footballers
American people of Afghan descent
American soccer players
Association football midfielders
Akron Zips men's soccer players
Canadian Premier League players
Flint City Bucks players
New York Red Bulls II players
New York Red Bulls U-23 players
Philadelphia Union players
Philadelphia Union II players
Memphis 901 FC players
Bhayangkara F.C. players
Soccer players from New Jersey
Sportspeople from Passaic County, New Jersey
Sportspeople of Afghan descent
USL League Two players
Major League Soccer players
USL Championship players
Liga 1 (Indonesia) players
Expatriate footballers in Poland
Expatriate footballers in Indonesia
Tampa Bay Rowdies players
Homegrown Players (MLS)
Expatriate soccer players in Canada
Afghan expatriate sportspeople in Indonesia